The Fighting Peacemaker is a 1926 American silent Western film directed by Clifford Smith and starring Jack Hoxie, Lola Todd and Ted Oliver.

Cast
 Jack Hoxie as 'Peace River' Parker
 Lola Todd as Jess Marshall 
 Ted Oliver as Jefferson Crane 
 William Steele as Clell Danert 
 Robert McKenzie as Hanna 
 Clark Comstock as Mr. Marshall - Jess's Father 
 Frank Rice as Sheriff

References

External links
 

1926 films
1926 Western (genre) films
Universal Pictures films
Films directed by Clifford Smith
American black-and-white films
Silent American Western (genre) films
1920s English-language films
1920s American films